When You Know is an album by American jazz singer Dianne Reeves. It was released on April 15, 2008 via Blue Note Records.

Track listing

Chart history

References

External links

2008 albums
Dianne Reeves albums
Blue Note Records albums
Albums produced by George Duke